Propane is a three-carbon alkane with the molecular formula . It is a gas at standard temperature and pressure, but compressible to a transportable liquid. A by-product of natural gas processing and petroleum refining, it is commonly used as a fuel in domestic and industrial applications and in low-emissions public transportation. Discovered in 1857 by the French chemist Marcellin Berthelot, it became commercially available in the US by 1911. Propane is one of a group of liquefied petroleum gases (LP gases). The others include butane, propylene, butadiene, butylene, isobutylene, and mixtures thereof. Propane has lower volumetric energy density, but higher gravimetric energy density and burns more cleanly than gasoline and coal.

Propane gas has become a popular choice for barbecues and portable stoves because its low −42 °C boiling point makes it vaporise inside pressurised liquid containers (2 phases). Propane powers buses, forklifts, taxis, outboard boat motors, and ice resurfacing machines and is used for heat and cooking in recreational vehicles and campers.

History 
Propane was discovered by the French chemist Marcellin Berthelot in 1857. It was found dissolved in Pennsylvanian light crude oil by Edmund Ronalds in 1864. Walter O. Snelling of the U.S. Bureau of Mines highlighted it as a volatile component in gasoline in 1910, which was the beginning of the propane industry in the United States. The volatility of these lighter hydrocarbons caused them to be known as "wild" because of the high vapor pressures of unrefined gasoline. On March 31, 1912, The New York Times reported on Snelling's work with liquefied gas, saying "a steel bottle will carry enough gas to light an ordinary home for three weeks".

It was during this time that Snelling, in cooperation with Frank P. Peterson, Chester Kerr, and Arthur Kerr, developed ways to liquefy the LP gases during the refining of gasoline. Together, they established American Gasol Co., the first commercial marketer of propane. Snelling had produced relatively pure propane by 1911, and on March 25, 1913, his method of processing and producing LP gases was issued patent #1,056,845. A separate method of producing LP gas through compression was developed by Frank Peterson and its patent granted on July 2, 1912.

The 1920s saw increased production of LP gas, with the first year of recorded production totaling  in 1922. In 1927, annual marketed LP gas production reached , and by 1935, the annual sales of LP gas had reached . Major industry developments in the 1930s included the introduction of railroad tank car transport, gas odorization, and the construction of local bottle-filling plants. The year 1945 marked the first year that annual LP gas sales reached a billion gallons. By 1947, 62% of all U.S. homes had been equipped with either natural gas or propane for cooking.

In 1950, 1,000 propane-fueled buses were ordered by the Chicago Transit Authority, and by 1958, sales in the U.S. had reached  annually.

The "prop-" root found in "propane" and names of other compounds with three-carbon chains was derived from "propionic acid", which in turn was named after the Greek words protos (meaning first) and pion (fat).

During the COVID-19 pandemic, propane shortages were reported in the United States.

Sources 
Propane is produced as a by-product of two other processes, natural gas processing and petroleum refining. The processing of natural gas involves removal of butane, propane, and large amounts of ethane from the raw gas, to prevent condensation of these volatiles in natural gas pipelines. Additionally, oil refineries produce some propane as a by-product of cracking petroleum into gasoline or heating oil.

The supply of propane cannot easily be adjusted to meet increased demand, because of the by-product nature of propane production. About 90% of U.S. propane is domestically produced. The United States imports about 10% of the propane consumed each year, with about 70% of that coming from Canada via pipeline and rail. The remaining 30% of imported propane comes to the United States from other sources via ocean transport.

After it is separated from the crude oil, North American propane is stored in huge salt caverns. Examples of these are Fort Saskatchewan, Alberta; Mont Belvieu, Texas; and Conway, Kansas. These salt caverns can store  of propane.

Properties and reactions 

Propane is a colorless, odorless gas. Ethyl mercaptan is added as a safety precaution as an odorant, and is commonly called a "rotten egg" smell. At normal pressure it liquifies below its boiling point at −42 °C and solidifies below its melting point at −187.7 °C. Propane crystallizes in the space group P21/n. The low space-filling of 58.5% (at 90 K), due to the bad stacking properties of the molecule, is the reason for the particularly low melting point.

Propane undergoes combustion reactions in a similar fashion to other alkanes. In the presence of excess oxygen, propane burns to form water and carbon dioxide.
C3H8 + 5 O2 -> 3 CO2 + 4 H2O + heat 
When insufficient oxygen is present for complete combustion, carbon monoxide, soot (carbon), or both, are formed as well:
C3H8 + 9/2 O2 -> 2 CO2 + CO + 4 H2O + heat 
C3H8 + 2 O2 -> 3 C + 4 H2O + heat 
The complete combustion of propane produces about 50 MJ/kg of heat.

Propane combustion is much cleaner than that of coal or unleaded gasoline. Propane's per-BTU production of CO2 is almost as low as that of natural gas. Propane burns hotter than home heating oil or diesel fuel because of the very high hydrogen content. The presence of C–C bonds, plus the multiple bonds of propylene and butylene, produce organic exhausts besides carbon dioxide and water vapor during typical combustion. These bonds also cause propane to burn with a visible flame.

Energy content 
The enthalpy of combustion of propane gas where all products return to standard state, for example where water returns to its liquid state at standard temperature (known as higher heating value), is (2,219.2 ± 0.5) kJ/mol, or (50.33 ± 0.01) MJ/kg.

The enthalpy of combustion of propane gas where products do not return to standard state, for example where the hot gases including water vapor exit a chimney, (known as lower heating value) is −2043.455 kJ/mol.  The lower heat value is the amount of heat available from burning the substance where the combustion products are vented to the atmosphere; for example, the heat from a fireplace when the flue is open.

Density 
The density of propane gas at 25 °C (77 °F) is 1.808 kg/m3, about 1.5× the density of air at the same temperature. The density of liquid propane at 25 °C (77 °F) is 0.493 g/cm3, which is equivalent to 4.11 pounds per U.S. liquid gallon or 493 g/L. Propane expands at 1.5% per 10 °F. Thus, liquid propane has a density of approximately 4.2 pounds per gallon (504 g/L) at 60 °F (15.6 °C).

As the density of propane changes with temperature, this fact must be considered every time when the application is connected with safety or custody transfer operations.

Etymology
Propane (or Propanee if conjugating in French) is derived from "colorless gas occurring in petroleum," 1866, with chemical suffix -ane + prop(ionic acid) (1850), from French propionique (1847), from Greek pro "forward" (see pro-) + pion "fat" (see fat (adj.)), which was so named in reference to its being first in order of the fatty acids.

Uses

Portable stoves
Propane is a popular choice for barbecues and portable stoves because the low boiling point of  makes it vaporize as soon as it is released from its pressurized container. Therefore, no carburetor or other vaporizing device is required; a simple metering nozzle suffices.

Refrigerant 

Blends of pure, dry "isopropane" (R-290a) (isobutane/propane mixtures) and isobutane (R-600a) can be used as the circulating refrigerant in suitably constructed compressor-based refrigeration. Compared to fluorocarbons, propane has a negligible ozone depletion potential and very low global warming potential (having a value of only 3.3 times the GWP of carbon dioxide) and can serve as a functional replacement for R-12, R-22, R-134a, and other chlorofluorocarbon or hydrofluorocarbon refrigerants in conventional stationary refrigeration and air conditioning systems. Because its global warming effect is far less than current refrigerants, propane was chosen as one of five replacement refrigerants approved by the EPA in 2015, for use in systems specially designed to handle its flammability.

Such substitution is widely prohibited or discouraged in motor vehicle air conditioning systems, on the grounds that using flammable hydrocarbons in systems originally designed to carry non-flammable refrigerant presents a significant risk of fire or explosion.

Vendors and advocates of hydrocarbon refrigerants argue against such bans on the grounds that there have been very few such incidents relative to the number of vehicle air conditioning systems filled with hydrocarbons.

Propane is also instrumental in providing off-the-grid refrigeration, as the energy source for a gas absorption refrigerator and is commonly used for camping and recreational vehicles.

Domestic and industrial fuel 

Since it can be transported easily, it is a popular fuel for home heat and backup electrical generation in sparsely populated areas that do not have natural gas pipelines.

In rural areas of North America, as well as northern Australia, propane is used to heat livestock facilities, in grain dryers, and other heat-producing appliances. When used for heating or grain drying it is usually stored in a large, permanently-placed cylinder which is refilled by a propane-delivery truck. , 6.2 million American households use propane as their primary heating fuel.

The bobtail tank truck is not unique to the North American market, though the practice is not as common elsewhere, and the vehicles are generally called tankers. In many countries, propane is delivered to end-users via small or medium-sized individual cylinders, while empty cylinders are removed for refilling at a central location.

There are also community propane systems, with a central cylinder feeding individual homes.

Motor fuel 

In the U.S., over 190,000 on-road vehicles use propane, and over 450,000 forklifts use it for power. It is the third most popular vehicle fuel in the world, behind gasoline and diesel fuel. In other parts of the world, propane used in vehicles is known as autogas. In 2007, approximately 13 million vehicles worldwide use autogas.

The advantage of propane in cars is its liquid state at a moderate pressure. This allows fast refill times, affordable fuel cylinder construction, and price ranges typically just over half that of gasoline. Meanwhile, it is noticeably cleaner (both in handling, and in combustion), results in less engine wear (due to carbon deposits) without diluting engine oil (often extending oil-change intervals), and until recently was relatively low-cost in North America. The octane rating of propane is relatively high at 110. In the United States the propane fueling infrastructure is the most developed of all alternative vehicle fuels. Many converted vehicles have provisions for topping off from "barbecue bottles". Purpose-built vehicles are often in commercially owned fleets, and have private fueling facilities. A further saving for propane fuel vehicle operators, especially in fleets, is that theft is much more difficult than with gasoline or diesel fuels.

Propane is also used as fuel for small engines, especially those used indoors or in areas with insufficient fresh air and ventilation to carry away the more toxic exhaust of an engine running on gasoline or diesel fuel. More recently, there have been lawn-care products like string trimmers, lawn mowers and leaf blowers intended for outdoor use, but fueled by propane in order to reduce air pollution.

Many heavy-duty highway trucks use propane as a boost, where it is added through the turbocharger, to mix with diesel fuel droplets. Propane droplets' very high hydrogen content helps the diesel fuel to burn hotter and therefore more completely. This provides more torque, more horsepower, and a cleaner exhaust for the trucks. It is normal for a 7-liter medium-duty diesel truck engine to increase fuel economy by 20 to 33 percent when a propane boost system is used. It is cheaper because propane is much cheaper than diesel fuel. The longer distance a cross-country trucker can travel on a full load of combined diesel and propane fuel means they can maintain federal hours of work rules with two fewer fuel stops in a cross-country trip. Truckers, tractor pulling competitions, and farmers have been using a propane boost system for over forty years in North America.

Shipping fuel

International ships can reuse propane from ocean-going ships that transport liquefied petroleum gas (LPG) because as the sun evaporates the propane during the voyage, the international ship catches the evaporating propane gas and feeds it into the air intake system of the ship's diesel engines. This reduces bunker fuel consumption and the pollution produced by the ships. There is an international agreement to use either propane or compressed natural gas (CNG) as a mandatory additive to the bunker fuel for all ocean traveling ships beginning in 2020.

Propane is generally stored and transported in steel cylinders as a liquid with a vapor space above the liquid. The vapor pressure in the cylinder is a function of temperature. When gaseous propane is drawn at a high rate, the latent heat of vaporization required to produce the gas will cause the bottle to cool. (This is why water often condenses on the sides of the bottle and then freezes). Since lightweight, high-octane propane vaporizes before the heavier, low-octane propane, the ignition properties change as the cylinder empties. For these reasons, the liquid is often withdrawn using a dip tube.

Other uses 
Propane is the primary flammable gas in blowtorches for soldering.
Propane is used in oxy-fuel welding and cutting. Propane does not burn as hot as acetylene in its inner cone, and so it is rarely used for welding. Propane, however, has a very high number of BTUs per cubic foot in its outer cone, and so with the right torch (injector style) it can make a faster and cleaner cut than acetylene, and is much more useful for heating and bending than acetylene.
Propane is used as a feedstock for the production of base petrochemicals in steam cracking.
Propane is the primary fuel for hot-air balloons.
It is used in semiconductor manufacture to deposit silicon carbide.
Propane is commonly used in theme parks and in movie production as an inexpensive, high-energy fuel for explosions and other special effects.
Propane is used as a propellant, relying on the expansion of the gas to fire the projectile. It does not ignite the gas. The use of a liquefied gas gives more shots per cylinder, compared to a compressed gas.
Propane is also used as a cooking fuel.
Propane is used as a propellant for many household aerosol sprays, including shaving creams and air fresheners.
Propane is a promising feedstock for the production of propylene.
Liquified propane is used in the extraction of animal fats and vegetable oils.

Purity
The North American standard grade of automotive-use propane is rated HD-5 (Heavy Duty 5%). HD-5 grade has a maximum of 5 percent butane, but propane sold in Europe has a maximum allowable amount of butane of 30 percent, meaning it is not the same fuel as HD-5. The LPG used as auto fuel and cooking gas in Asia and Australia also has very high butane content.

Propylene (also called propene) can be a contaminant of commercial propane. Propane containing too much propene is not suited for most vehicle fuels. HD-5 is a specification that establishes a maximum concentration of 5% propene in propane. Propane and other LP gas specifications are established in ASTM D-1835. All propane fuels include an odorant, almost always ethanethiol, so that the gas can be smelled easily in case of a leak. Propane as HD-5 was originally intended for use as vehicle fuel. HD-5 is currently being used in all propane applications.

Typically in the United States and Canada, LPG is primarily propane (at least 90%), while the rest is mostly ethane, propylene, butane, and odorants including ethyl mercaptan. This is the HD-5 standard, (maximum allowable propylene content, and no more than 5% butanes and ethane) defined by the American Society for Testing and Materials by its Standard 1835 for internal combustion engines. Not all products labeled "LPG" conform to this standard, however. In Mexico, for example, gas labeled "LPG" may consist of 60% propane and 40% butane. "The exact proportion of this combination varies by country, depending on international prices, on the availability of components and, especially, on the climatic conditions that favor LPG with higher butane content in warmer regions and propane in cold areas".

Comparison with natural gas 
Propane is bought and stored in a liquid form, LPG. It can easily be stored in a relatively small space.

By comparison, compressed natural gas (CNG) cannot be liquefied by compression at normal temperatures, as these are well above its critical temperature. As a gas, very high pressure is required to store useful quantities. This poses the hazard that, in an accident, just as with any compressed gas cylinder (such as a CO2 cylinder used for a soda concession) a CNG cylinder may burst with great force, or leak rapidly enough to become a self-propelled missile. Therefore, CNG is much less efficient to store than propane, due to the large cylinder volume required. An alternative means of storing natural gas is as a cryogenic liquid in an insulated container as liquefied natural gas (LNG). This form of storage is at low pressure and is around 3.5 times as efficient as storing it as CNG.

Unlike propane, if a spill occurs, CNG will evaporate and dissipate because it is lighter than air.

Propane is much more commonly used to fuel vehicles than is natural gas, because that equipment costs less.

Hazards 
Propane is a simple asphyxiant. Unlike natural gas, it is denser than air. It may accumulate in low spaces and near the floor. When abused as an inhalant, it may cause hypoxia (lack of oxygen), pneumonia, cardiac failure or cardiac arrest. Propane has low toxicity since it is not readily absorbed and is not biologically active. Commonly stored under pressure at room temperature, propane and its mixtures will flash evaporate at atmospheric pressure and cool well below the freezing point of water. The cold gas, which appears white due to moisture condensing from the air, may cause frostbite.

Propane is denser than air. If a leak in a propane fuel system occurs, the vaporized gas will have a tendency to sink into any enclosed area and thus poses a risk of explosion and fire. The typical scenario is a leaking cylinder stored in a basement; the propane leak drifts across the floor to the pilot light on the furnace or water heater, and results in an explosion or fire. This property makes propane generally unsuitable as a fuel for boats. In 2007, a heavily investigated vapor-related explosion occurred in Ghent, West Virginia, U.S., killing four people and completely destroying the Little General convenience store on Flat Top Road, causing several injuries.

Another hazard associated with propane storage and transport is known as a BLEVE or boiling liquid expanding vapor explosion. The Kingman Explosion involved a railroad tank car in Kingman, Arizona, U.S., in 1973 during a propane transfer. The fire and subsequent explosions resulted in twelve fatalities and numerous injuries.

Retail cost

United States 
, the retail cost of propane was approximately $2.37 per gallon, or roughly $25.95 per 1 million BTUs. This means that filling a 500-gallon propane tank, which is what households that use propane as their main source of energy usually require, costs $948 (80% of 500 gallons or 400 gallons), a 7.5% increase on the 2012–2013 winter season average US price. However, propane costs per gallon change significantly from one state to another: the Energy Information Administration (EIA) quotes a $2.995 per gallon average on the East Coast for October 2013, while the figure for the Midwest was $1.860 for the same period.

 the propane retail cost was approximately $1.97 per gallon. This means that filling a 500-gallon propane tank to 80% capacity costs $788, a 16.9% decrease or $160 less from the November 2013 quote in this section. Similar regional differences in prices are present with the December 2015 EIA figure for the East Coast at $2.67 per gallon and the Midwest at $1.43 per gallon.

 the average US propane retail cost was approximately $2.48 per gallon. The wholesale price of propane in the U.S. always drops in the summer as most homes do not require it for home heating. The wholesale price of propane in the summer of 2018 was between 86 cents to 96 cents per U.S. gallon, based on a truckload or railway car load. The price for home heating is exactly double that price; at 95 cents per gallon wholesale, a home-delivered price was $1.90 per gallon if ordered 500 gallons at a time. Prices in the midwest are always cheaper than California. Prices for home delivery always go up near the end of August or the first few days of September when people start ordering their home tanks to be filled.

See also 
Blau gas
National Propane Gas Association
 Propane accessories
Hank Hill

References

External links 

 Canadian Propane Association
   (syngas)
 International Chemical Safety Card 0319
 National Propane Gas Association (U.S.)
 NIOSH Pocket Guide to Chemical Hazards
 Propane Education & Research Council (U.S.)
 Propane Properties Explained Descriptive Breakdown of Propane Characteristics
 UKLPG: Propane and Butane in the UK
 US Energy Information Administration
 World LP Gas Association (WLPGA)

 
Fuel gas
Industrial gases
Aerosol propellants
Alkanes
Natural gas
Refrigerants
GABAA receptor positive allosteric modulators
E-number additives
Fossil fuels